Mohonasen High School is a high school located in Rotterdam, New York, United States.  Enrollment is around 1200 students in Grades 9 – 12. Like all other public schools in New York, the school's curriculum is based on the Board of Regents standards. Mohonasen High School is known throughout the Capital District for its award winning and varied televised events schedule, under the direction of Mr. Marvin Q. Veeder.

Name
The name of the school is derived from the names of three members of the Iroquois League, the Mohawk, the Onondaga, and the Seneca (Moh-Ona-Sen).

References

External links
Official website
Public School Review

Educational institutions established in 1960
Public high schools in New York (state)
Buildings and structures in Schenectady, New York
Schools in Schenectady County, New York
1960 establishments in New York (state)